Time Express was an American fantasy drama series that was broadcast on CBS from April 26 to May 17, 1979, and later syndicated. The series was created by Ivan Goff and Ben Roberts who had both previously been involved in the creation of Charlie's Angels and Mannix. The series ran for four episodes before being cancelled.

Plot
The series is in anthology format, similar to other dramatic television series on American networks of the time such as The Love Boat, Fantasy Island, and to a Lesser extent; NBC's Supertrain which premiered roughly 2 months earlier. Each episode consists of two tales featuring guest actors. The featured characters would receive an invitation from "The Head of The Line" to travel to some time and place in the past where a crucial point in their lives had occurred. They would arrive at Los Angeles Union Passenger Terminal and go to the "Special Services" desk, where the ticket clerk (Woodrow Parfrey) would direct them to "Gate Y, Track 13" (which was listed as "closed" on the public departure board). On board the train (operated by Engineer Callahan (William Phipps) and conductor R. J. Walker (James Reynolds), who, in the initial episode were revealed to have been killed in a derailment on the "Allegheny Flyer" in 1886), they would be welcomed by hosts Jason and Margaret Winters (the husband and wife team of Vincent Price and Coral Browne) who would warn them of the risks of travelling to the past. On arrival, they would relive the period, potentially changing events, and then return by train to the present, where the implications of the changes would be revealed.

Cast
Vincent Price as Jason Winters
Coral Browne as Margaret Winters
James Reynolds as R. J. Walker
William Phipps as Engineer Callahan
Woodrow Parfrey as the ticket clerk

Episodes

References

External links

1979 American television series debuts
1979 American television series endings
1970s American time travel television series
CBS original programming
American fantasy television series
American time travel television series
English-language television shows
Television shows set in California
Television series by Warner Bros. Television Studios
American fantasy drama television series